Undercover Girl is a 1958 British crime film directed by Francis Searle and starring Paul Carpenter, Kay Callard and Bruce Seton.

It was shot at Twickenham Studios. The film's sets were designed by the art director Denys Pavitt. It was produced as a second feature for distribution by Butcher's Film Service which specialised in releasing low-budget productions.

Cast
 Paul Carpenter as Johnny Carter 
 Kay Callard as Joan Foster 
 Monica Grey as Evelyn King 
 Bruce Seton as Ted Austin 
 Jackie Collins as Peggy Foster 
 Maya Koumani as Miss Brazil 
 Kim Parker as Maid 
 Tony Quinn as Mike O'Sullivan 
 John Boxer as Farrell 
 Alexander Field as Hunter 
 Paddy Ryan as Cash 
 Milton Reid as Mac 
 Eleanor Leigh as Carrie 
 Robert Raglan as Willingdon 
 George Roderick as Johnson 
 Michael Moore as Dr. Miller 
 Totti Truman Taylor as Nurse Fry 
 Mark Hashfield as Doctor
 Gerry Collins as Barman

References

Bibliography
 Chibnall, Steve & McFarlane, Brian. The British 'B' Film. Palgrave MacMillan, 2009.

External links

1958 films
British crime films
1958 crime films
Films directed by Francis Searle
Films shot at Twickenham Film Studios
Butcher's Film Service films
1950s English-language films
1950s British films